Alicia Jayne Rule (born 1976) is an American politician of the Democratic Party. In 2020, she was elected to the Washington House of Representatives to represent the 42nd legislative district and took office on January 11, 2021.

Rule was re-elected in 2022.

References

Living people
21st-century American politicians
People from Blaine, Washington
1976 births
Democratic Party members of the Washington House of Representatives